Clarence Coleman (born June 4, 1980) is a former gridiron football wide receiver. He was signed as an undrafted free agent by the Buffalo Bills in 2003. He played college football at Ferris State University.

External links
BC Lions Bio
Ferris State University Bio

American football wide receivers
Canadian football wide receivers
American players of Canadian football
BC Lions players
Buffalo Bills players
Ferris State Bulldogs football players
Grand Rapids Rampage players
Players of American football from Miami
1980 births
Living people
Players of Canadian football from Miami
Miramar High School alumni